Eien is a Japanese era name.

Eien may also refer to:

 Eien (album), a 1999 album by Zard
 "Eien" (Zard song), 1997
 "Eien" (Beni song), 2012
 "Eien / Universe / Believe in Love", a 2009 song by BoA